Clathrina ramosa is a species of calcareous sponge from Chile.

References

External links

Animals described in 2009
Invertebrates of Chile